Mecodema puiakium is a ground beetle of the family Carabidae, endemic to New Zealand.

References

Beetles of New Zealand
puiakium
Beetles described in 2007